Okçular is a village in the Karacabey district, Bursa Province, Turkey.

It is located in the 20 km west of the Karacabey district.

References 

Villages in Karacabey District